Manalapan is a town in Palm Beach County, Florida, United States. The population was 419 at the 2020 United States census.

History

United States President Benjamin Harrison granted George H. K. Carter a homestead in 1889 on the yet unnamed land. In 1931, the sparsely populated settlement was incorporated by Harold Stirling Vanderbilt as the "Town of Manalapan". A large share of the first settlers being natives of Manalapan, New Jersey caused the name to be selected.

One of the most puzzling mysteries in Florida history was the disappearance of Circuit Judge Curtis Chillingworth and his wife Marjorie, who left a friend's home on the night of June 14, 1955, en route to their oceanfront cottage in Manalapan. It was established five years later that the couple were murdered by hitmen hired by one of Curtis Chillingworth's fellow judges. The Chillingworths were thrown overboard from a boat into the ocean with lead weights strapped to their legs; their bodies were never recovered.

The U.S. presidential yacht Sequoia was auctioned at the La Coquille Club in Manalapan on March 25, 1977 during the Carter administration, for US$286,000, as a symbolic cutback in Federal Government spending (annual cost to the U.S. Navy was $800,000) and to reduce signs of an "imperial presidency".

The popular tourist restaurant John G's moved to Manalapan in 2011.

A 22-acre property in Manalapan was purchased by Larry Ellison in 2022 for $173 million, making it the most expensive home sale in Florida history. The property spans A1A and is connected by a series of tunnels under the road.

Geography

Manalapan is a small beach side community.  It is bordered on the north by the bridge, beach access road and beach for the Town of Lantana, Florida; on the west by the Lake Worth Lagoon; on the south by the South Lake Worth Inlet (known locally as "Boynton Inlet"); and on the east by the Atlantic Ocean.

Demographics

As of the census of 2000, there were 321 people, 167 households, and 107 families residing in the town. The racial makeup of the town was 98.13% White (95% were Non-Hispanic White,) 1.56% Asian and 0.31% Pacific Islander. Hispanic or Latino of any race were 3.12% of the population.

There were 167 households, out of which 9.6% had children under the age of 18 living with them, 59.9% were married couples living together, 2.4% had a female householder with no husband present, and 35.9% were non-families. 30.5% of all households were made up of individuals, and 21.0% had someone living alone who was 65 years of age or older. The average household size was 1.92 and the average family size was 2.33.

In the town, the population was spread out, with 7.8% under the age of 18, 2.2% from 18 to 24, 13.4% from 25 to 44, 35.8% from 45 to 64, and 40.8% who were 65 years of age or older. The median age was 61 years. For every 100 females, there were 94.5 males. For every 100 females age 18 and over, there were 91.0 males.

The median income for a household in the town was $127,819, and the median income for a family was $117,051. Males had a median income of over $100,000 versus $36,250 for females. The per capita income for the town was $143,729. About 3.7% of families and 5.9% of the population were below the poverty line, including none of those under age 18 and 4.3% of those age 65 or over.

As of 2000, speakers of English as a first language accounted for 98.54%, while French as a mother tongue accounted for 1.45% of the population.
As of 2004, the population recorded by the U.S. Census Bureau was 340.

Notable people

 F. Lee Bailey, famed criminal defense attorney
 Geoff Brabham, race car driver; IMSA GTP champion
 Curtis Chillingworth, Circuit Judge, Palm Beach, Florida; murdered with his wife Marjorie in 1955
 Larry Ellison, purchaser of the most expensive home in Florida for $173 million in 2022
 Gloria Guinness, wife of Loel Guinness, Mexican socialite and fashion icon
 Thomas "Loel" Guinness, member of the Guinness beer family who made his own fortune in banking and real estate
 Don King (boxing promoter)
 Charles Peter McColough, former Xerox chairman and CEO; his family had an oceanfront estate in Manalapan for nearly 50 years
 Generoso Pope, Jr., founded National Enquirer
 Hal Prewitt, past Town Commissioner, artist, photographer, race car driver, inventor of personal computer products and early pioneer in the personal computer revolution
 Lois Pope, philanthropist/widow of Generoso Pope, Jr.
 Tony Robbins, self-help guru; relocated to Manalapan in 2013
 Yanni, musician, lives in oceanfront home

References

External links
 Town of Manalapan

Towns in Palm Beach County, Florida
Populated coastal places in Florida on the Atlantic Ocean
Towns in Florida
Beaches of Palm Beach County, Florida
Beaches of Florida